Sandro Neurater (born 21 March 1992) is an Austrian football player. He plays for WSG Swarovski Tirol II.

Club career
He made his Austrian Football First League debut for WSG Wattens on 22 July 2016 in a game against FC Blau-Weiß Linz.

References

External links
 

1992 births
Living people
Austrian footballers
WSG Tirol players
2. Liga (Austria) players
Austrian Football Bundesliga players
Austrian Regionalliga players
Association football defenders